Gavin Fraser (born 4 August 1952) is a South African cricketer. He played in 35 first-class and 6 List A matches from 1977/78 to 1989/90.

References

External links
 

1952 births
Living people
South African cricketers
Border cricketers
Eastern Province cricketers
Cricketers from Port Elizabeth